Offers.com is an online marketplace that connects consumers with coupons, coupon codes, product deals, and special offers from about 16,000 retailers and brands.

History

Offers.com was founded in 2009 by Steve Schaffer. In 2010, the company received a $7 million investment from Susquehanna Growth Equity. The company was acquired by Ziff Davis in December 2015.

Consumer research and insights

Offers.com conducts several consumer surveys throughout the year and pairs them with internal user behavior to gain insights on retail shopping trends. The company publishes survey findings on its blog to provide consumers with shopping and savings advice.    
 
Offers.com's data and savings tips have been quoted by national publications such as Time, eMarketer, ABC News and Consumer Reports among others.

Related applications

The Offers.com app is available for iOS and Android smartphones. The app functions much like the Offers.com site, enabling users to search for coupons and deals from retailers and restaurants.  Offers.com also provides a browser extension available for Chrome and Firefox. The extension alerts users of any current deals, discounts, or coupon codes available at stores they visit online.

Awards and recognition

CJ Affiliate by Conversant named Offers.com Publisher of the Year in 2015 and 2010, People's Choice in 2009, and Publisher of the Year (Retail) in 2015.

Philanthropy

Every year, the company offers a $2,500 scholarship to college students nationwide. To enter, students compose a short essay on a topic related to saving money. The company also participates with the Habitat for Humanity in Austin.

References 

Internet properties established in 2009
Online marketplaces of the United States